Károly Németh can refer to:

 Károly Németh (judoka) (born 1957), Hungarian judoka
 Károly Németh (politician) (1922-2008), Hungarian politician
 Károly Németh (table tennis) (born 1970), Hungarian table tennis player